Mallela Theertham is a waterfall located in the Nallamala Forest in Nagarkurnool, Telangana, India. The River Krishna flows through this forest.  It is located around 58 km from Srisailam and 185 km from Hyderabad.

Waterfall
Mallela Theertham is in the middle of the dense forest. A walk down 350 steps is required to access the waterfall.

The best flows are from the months of October to February.March to June is the dry season. The remaining months are rainy months, and it is very difficult to drive on the muddy road. The water comes from a small rivulet and from this area,

It flows through the dense jungle and then meets the Krishna River. This place is near to Achampet.

History

It is said that many sages have performed penances there for Shiva and Shiva has himself appeared there to many of his devotees. It is believed that many tigers visit there to drink water during summer.

See also
 List of waterfalls in India

References

Waterfalls of Telangana